AEROS satellites were to study the aeronomy i. e. the science of the upper atmosphere and ionosphere, in particular the F region under the strong influence of  solar extreme ultraviolet radiation. To this end the spectrum of this radiation was recorded aboard by one instrument (of type Hinteregger) on the one hand and a set of 4 other instruments measuring the most important neutral uand iononized parameters at the satellite's position on the other.

Aeros was built by Ball Aerospace for a co-operative project between NASA and the Bundesministerium für Foschung und Technologie (BMwF), Federal Republic of Germany.

Named for the Greek god of the air at the suggestion of the BMwF .

AEROS A  and B carried identical instrumentation only the instrument measuring short scale variations of the electron density didn't work on A. A third Aeros C was planned for Earth Resources studies in a 3-axis spin-stabilized configuration, to be launched by a Shuttle in 1986.(Needs research)

Specifications 
 Source: Yenne
Launch vehicles: Scout
Launch location: Western Space and Missile Center at Vandenberg AFB
Launch dates: 16 December 1972 (AEROS), 16 July 1974 (AEROS B)
Re-entry dates: 22 August 1973 (AEROS), 2 September 1975 (AEROS B)
Total weight: 280 pounds and 436 pounds for AEROS C
Diameter: 36 inches
Height: 28 inches
Shape: Cylindrical
Power: Solar cells/nickel-cadmium batteries
Power requirements: 4.7-34.3 watts

References

External links

 Goddard Space Flight Center
 AEROS B Satellite

Weather satellites of the United States
NASA satellites
Science and technology in West Germany
Satellites of Germany
Spacecraft launched in 1972
Spacecraft launched in 1974
Spacecraft which reentered in 1973
Spacecraft which reentered in 1975